The eighth season of Cheers, an American television sitcom, originally aired on NBC in the United States between September 21, 1989, and May 3, 1990. The show was created by director James Burrows and writers Glen and Les Charles under production team Charles Burrows Charles Productions, in association with Paramount Television.

At the 1990 42nd Primetime Emmy Awards, this season won three Emmys: Outstanding Lead Actor in a Comedy Series (Ted Danson), Outstanding Supporting Actress in a Comedy Series (Bebe Neuwirth), and Outstanding Sound Mixing for a Comedy Series or Special. It also won the Best Television Series – Musical or Comedy and Best Performance by an Actress in a Television Series – Musical or Comedy (Kirstie Alley) at the 1991 48th Golden Globe Awards.

Background

This season premiered on September 21, 1989, and aired on Thursdays at 9:00 pm Eastern / 8:00 pm Central. Besides Cheers, other series in NBC's Thursday night lineup for the 1989–90 season were The Cosby Show, A Different World, Dear John and L.A. Law. In January 1990, Dear John was shifted to Wednesdays, and the newer sitcom Grand took its spot.

Cast and characters
 Ted Danson as Sam Malone, a womanizing bartender and ex-baseball player. While he still pursues many women, he fails to impress  especially classier ones. He continues his efforts to buy back Cheers, which he sold to its current owner, the Lillian Corporation, in the sixth season.
 Kirstie Alley as Rebecca Howe, a corporate bar owner and manager. Since her debut in the sixth season, she has struggled to be noticed by her superiors at the Lillian Corporation. This season, she has been dating an English multimillionaire, Robin Colcord. He owns her company's competitor and plans to take over Lillian Corporation.
 Rhea Perlman as Carla Tortelli, a waitress and mother of eight children, including five from her first marriage. Her current husband, Eddie LeBec, dies in an accident while saving someone. She then learns that he committed bigamy by marrying another woman who is pregnant with twins, while he was still married to Carla.
 John Ratzenberger as Cliff Clavin, a postal carrier and loquacious, barfly know-it-all.
 Woody Harrelson as Woody Boyd, a dim bartender. He dates a less-than-bright rich woman named Kelly Gaines, whose family disapproves of him.
 Kelsey Grammer as Frasier Crane, a psychiatrist now married to Lilith. Their son Frederick is born during this season.
 George Wendt as Norm Peterson, an accountant and a house painter.

Recurring characters

 Bebe Neuwirth as Lilith Sternin, a psychiatrist now married to Frasier. She gives birth to their son Frederick.
 Roger Rees as Robin Colcord, an English multimillionaire. He dates his love interest Rebecca, who works for his competitor Lillian Corporation, and a couple other women simultaneously. He uses her to take over his competitor but then realizes that he loves her very much.
 Jackie Swanson as Kelly Gaines, a less-than-bright rich woman. She dates bartender Woody despite her family's disapproval. Swanson reprises her role as Kelly in three episodes this season.

Episodes

Specials
</onlyinclude>

Production
In November 1989, actor Roger Rees told news agency Knight-Ridder Wire about Robin Colcord, the character whom Rees portrayed: They needed a fillip, to give them a boost, someone to drive Sam [Malone] crazy. Robin's there to be dashing, sexy, irritating. He's not as charming and nice as he appears to be at first sight. He's sort of the villain of the piece. He's a megalomaniac millionaire. He's got an airline and a helicopter fleet. It's very much Donald Trump. In January 1990, actor Rees said that he had not based "the character on anyone", despite "speculation that Colcord was a British version of Trump", wrote Phil Kloer of Cox News Service.

Critical reception
Ken Tucker of Entertainment Weekly graded the season an A−, calling it "still awfully funny". He praised the supporting characters but criticizing the development of Sam Malone and Rebecca Howe. Jeffrey Robinson of DVDTalk rated the season's content three-and-a-half stars out of five and its replay value four out of five.

Accolades
At the 42nd Primetime Emmy Awards (1990), this season won three Emmys: Outstanding Lead Actor in a Comedy Series (Ted Danson), Outstanding Supporting Actress in a Comedy Series (Bebe Neuwirth), and Outstanding Sound Mixing for a Comedy Series or Special. Before his eighth nomination and Emmy win, Danson had seven consecutive Emmy nominations for the role of Sam Malone, and a nomination for his leading role in a 1984 television film Something About Amelia. Danson also won a Golden Globe award for Best Performance by an Actor in a Television Series (Musical or Comedy) at the 47th (1990) and 48th Golden Globe Awards (1991). The 1990 season also won the Best Television Series – Musical or Comedy and Best Performance by an Actress in a Television Series – Musical or Comedy (Kirstie Alley) at the 48th Golden Globe Awards (1991).

DVD release

References

General references

Ratings sources 
According to many newspapers, including the main source USA Today, the 1989–90 Nielsen ratings are based on 92.1 million households that have at least one television.

8
1989 American television seasons
1990 American television seasons